A fake field goal is a trick play in American football. Simply, it involves a running or passing play done out of a kick formation. Usually the holder (often the punter or backup quarterback on most teams) will throw or run. Less frequently, the placekicker, who virtually never handles the ball in an American football game, will serve as the passer or rusher on a fake field goal. 

During a fake field goal, most teams will choose one of two different alignment options. The first one is out of the normal field goal formation. The holder receives the snap and can either pitch it to the kicker, throw it during a designed pass play, or run the ball themselves. The second option is to shift into a special formation. Out of these special formations, multiple plays can be brought to the field. 

There are a few of advantages to running a fake field goal or extra point. First, if it is a field goal, you have the chance to either score a touchdown or extend a drive for your team. If it is an extra point conversion, you have the chance of, instead of scoring just one point, scoring two points instead. 

Danny White was both quarterback and punter for the Dallas Cowboys in the 1980s and often executed this play.  Examples include then-New England kicker Adam Vinatieri receiving a direct snap and throwing a touchdown pass during an NFL game in 2004, and LSU kicker Colt David rushing for a 15-yard touchdown in 2007 after receiving the ball on a blind lateral from holder (and starting quarterback) Matt Flynn.

Not every fake field goal play call results in an attempted trick play. In the Week 8 2014 game between the Indianapolis Colts and Pittsburgh Steelers, the Colts staff had scouted through film study, that the Steelers usual kick block formation when the ball was close to the end zone and on the left hash mark, would not be able to prevent the holder from running the ball in for a touchdown. Such a situation developed with 1 second left on the clock in the 2nd half. But instead of lining up as normal, Troy Polamalu, an 8 time defensive Pro-Bowl and 6 time All-Pro player, shifted from his usual position to the other side, filling the gap where holder Pat McAfee intended to run the ball. McAfee noticed this, and aborted the trick play, calling for Adam Vinatieri to make a normal kick, which he did, scoring 3 points to make the score 20 for the Colts to 35 to the Steelers.

References

American football plays